Events from the year 1963 in Romania. The year saw the continued de-satellization of Communist Romania.

Incumbents
President of the State Council and General Secretary of the Romanian Communist Party: Gheorghe Gheorghiu-Dej..
Prime Minister: Ion Gheorghe Maurer.

Events
 15 May – The film Codine, directed by Henri Colpi, wins Best Screenplay at the 1963 Cannes Film Festival.
 30 November – The Romanian and Yugoslavian governments agree to develop the Iron Gate Hydroelectric Power Station.
 Unknown – As part of de-satellization from the Soviet Union, street names with Soviet influences are renamed. For example, Strada Kirov becomes Strada Onesti.

Births
 5 July – Adriana Bazon, rower, silver medal winner at the 1984, 1988 and 1992 Summer Olympics.
 17 August – Ruxandra Cesereanu, poet and writer.
 30 September – Lucia Sauca, rower, silver medal winner at the 1984 Summer Olympics.
 16 December – Viorica Dăncilă, Prime Minister between 2018 and 2019.

Deaths
 5 February – Ion Mihalache, politician, the founder and leader of the Peasants' Party, died at Râmnicu Sărat Prison (born 1882).
 9 May – Alexandru Rusu, bishop of the Greek-Catholic Church, died at Gherla Prison, beatified in 2019 (born 1884).
 22 June – Maria Tănase, singer and actor (born 1913).
 30 September – Paul Alexiu, major-general during World War II (born 1893).

References

Years of the 20th century in Romania
1963 in Romania
Romania
Romania